Tamura (usually written 田村), a Japanese placename and family name, may refer to:

In places:
Tamura, Fukushima, a city in Japan
Tamura District, Fukushima, in Japan
Tamura Station, in Nagahama, Japan

People with the surname Tamura:
Tamura (surname)
Tamura clan, a Japanese samurai clan